The earliest Soviet jet fighters were all straight-winged as the aerodynamic benefits of swept wings at transonic speeds was not yet appreciated for several years after the end of World War II when these fighters were designed.

 Alekseyev I-21
 Alekseyev I-212
 Lavochkin La-150 
 Lavochkin La-152 
Lavochkin La-154
 Lavochkin La-156
 Mikoyan-Gurevich MiG-9
 Sukhoi Su-9 (1946)
 Sukhoi Su-11 (1947)
Sukhoi Su-13
 Yakovlev Yak-15 
 Yakovlev Yak-17 
 Yakovlev Yak-19
 Yakovlev Yak-23  
 Yakovlev Yak-25 (1947)

Soviet Union, List of straight-winged jet fighters of
Aircraft
Soviet and Russian military aircraft